Leonel Rivas (born 4 December 1999) is an Argentine professional footballer who plays as an attacking midfielder for Greek Super League 2 club Almopos Aridea.

References

1999 births
Living people
Argentine footballers
Argentine expatriate footballers
Argentine expatriate sportspeople in Greece
Expatriate footballers in Greece
Argentine Primera División players
Super League Greece 2 players
Rosario Central footballers
Talleres de Córdoba footballers
Almopos Aridea F.C. players
Association football midfielders
Footballers from Rosario, Santa Fe